Stephane Aziz Ki (born 6 March 1996) is a professional footballer who plays as a midfielder for Tanzanian Premier League club Young Africans.Born in the Ivory Coast, he represents the Burkina Faso national team.

Club career

Omonia Nicosia
In January 2017, he moved to Omonia, from CD San Roque de Lepe. With Omonia, Ki has had 13 appearances, including seven starts.

Club statistics

International career
Aziz Ki was born in Ivory Coast and is of Burkinabé descent. He made his debut for Burkina Faso in a friendly 2-0 loss to Morocco on 24 March 2017.

International goals

References

External links

Living people
1996 births
Citizens of Burkina Faso through descent
Burkinabé footballers
Burkina Faso international footballers
Ivorian footballers
Ivorian people of Burkinabé descent
Sportspeople of Burkinabé descent
Burkinabé expatriate footballers
Expatriate footballers in Cyprus
Association football midfielders
CD San Roque de Lepe footballers
AC Omonia players
Aris Limassol FC players
Nea Salamis Famagusta FC players
Segunda División B players
Cypriot First Division players
Footballers from Abidjan
21st-century Burkinabé people